Pastor Hall is a 1940 British drama film directed by Roy Boulting and starring Wilfrid Lawson, Nova Pilbeam, Marius Goring, Seymour Hicks and Bernard Miles. The film is based on the play of the same title by German author Ernst Toller who had lived as an emigrant in the United States until his suicide in 1939. The U.S. version of the film opened with a prologue by Eleanor Roosevelt denouncing the Nazis, and her son James Roosevelt presented the film in the US through United Artists.

Plot
The film was based on the true story of the German pastor Martin Niemöller who was sent to Dachau concentration camp for criticizing the Nazi Party.  In the 1930s, a small German village, Altdorf, is taken over by a platoon of stormtroopers loyal to Hitler. The SS go about teaching and enforcing 'The New Order' but the pastor, a kind and gentle man, will not be intimidated. While some villagers join the Nazi Party avidly, and some just go along with things, hoping for a quiet life, the pastor takes his convictions to the pulpit. Because of his criticism of the Nazis, the pastor is sent to Dachau.

Cast
Pastor Frederick Hall - 	Wilfred Lawson
Christine Hall - 	Nova Pilbeam
General von Grotjahn - 	Seymour Hicks
Fritz Gerte - 	Marius Goring
Werner von Grotjahn - 	Brian Worth
Herr Veit - 	Percy Walsh
Lina Veit - 	 Lina Barrie
Pippermann - 	Eliot Makeham
Erwin Kohn - 	Peter Cotes
Freundlich - 	Edmund Willard
Nazi Pastor - 	Hay Petrie
Heinrich Degan - 	Bernard Miles
Vogel - 	Manning Whiley
Johann Herder - 	J. Fisher White
Frau Kemp - 	Barbara Gott

Critical reception
The New York Times reviewer wrote that "not until Pastor Hall opened last night at the Globe has any film come so close to the naked spiritual issues involved in the present conflict or presented them in terms so moving. If it is propaganda, it is also more...In its production the film is mechanically inferior. The sound track is uneven, the lighting occasionally bad. But in its performances it has been well endowed. Much of the film's dignity and cumulative emotion comes from the fine performance of Wilfrid Lawson as the pastor." TV Guide called the film "far less heavy-handed than most wartime films Hollywood cranked out after Pearl Harbor."

References

External links

1940 films
1940 drama films
British drama films
1940s English-language films
British films based on plays
World War II films made in wartime
Films about Nazi Germany
British black-and-white films
1940s British films